Ronald E. Guenther (born October 3, 1945) is a former American football player, coach, and college athletics administrator.  He served as the head football coach at North Central College in Naperville, Illinois from 1975 to 1978, compiling a record of  22–12–2.  Guenther was the athletic director at the University of Illinois at Urbana–Champaign from 1992 until he retired on July 1, 2011.

Education and playing career
Guenther is a graduate of the University of Illinois, having earned a Bachelor of Science in physical education in 1967 and an M.S. in administration in 1968. Guenther also played football at Illinois, lettering in 1965 and 1966 as an offensive lineman as well as being named second-team All-Big Ten and the team MVP in 1966. While at Illinois, Guenther was a member of the Kappa Sigma Fraternity.

Administrative career
University of Illinois Chancellor Richard Herman was quoted in July, 2006 as saying: "If he's not the best AD in the country, I want to know who is." and "He does a wonderful job of bringing in great coaches and building a team that understands what athletics is and needs to be about." (Herman was later relieved of his duties after a scholarship scandal.)

Coaches hired

Football
Ron Turner, 1997–2004
Ron Zook, 2005–2011

Men's basketball
 Lon Kruger, 1996–2000
 Bill Self, 2000–2003
 Bruce Weber, 2004–2012

Women's basketball
 Theresa Grentz, 1995–2006
 Jolette Law, 2007–2012

Women's volleyball
Don Hardin, 1996–2009
Kevin Hambly, 2009–2017

Men's tennis
 Craig Tiley, 1993-2005
 Brad Dancer, 2006–current

Women's tennis
 Michelle Dasso, 2006–2015

Men's Track and Field
 Wayne Angel, 2003–2009

Wrestling
 Jim Heffernan, 2009–2021

Facility construction
 Atkins Tennis Center
 Reconstruction of Memorial Stadium
 Pending decision to renovate Assembly Hall or build a new basketball arena, expected in early 2009

Criticism
Guenther came under fire for an outburst during the 2007 NCAA Tournament, calling an Illini player an "idiot".

Guenther has also been widely criticized by Illinois fans for the poor performance of the Illinois football team during his tenure.

Head coaching record

References

1945 births
Living people
American football offensive linemen
Boston College Eagles football coaches
Illinois Fighting Illini athletic directors
Illinois Fighting Illini football players
North Central Cardinals football coaches
High school football coaches in Illinois
People from Elmhurst, Illinois
Players of American football from Illinois